Aslam Khan, sometimes known as Prince Aslam Khan (romanized as: Shehzada Aslam Khaan; 15 March 1935 – 29 April 1980) was a Pakistani cricketer who played first-class cricket between 1955 and 1978. Some people consider him the inventor of doosra.

A son of Ghulam Moinuddin Khanji, he was a member of the royal family of Manavadar, a princely state which is now part of the Indian state of Gujarat.

Aslam Khan was a left-arm spinner. In the final of the Ayub Trophy in 1964-65 he took 6 for 45 and 5 for 92 (match figures of 81.5–43–137–11) to help Karachi to an innings victory over Lahore Education Board. In a semi-final of the Ayub Trophy in 1965-66, playing for Karachi Blues against Public Works Department, he took 3 for 35 and 5 for 41 in another victory.

He played his last first-class match in February 1978 for the Pakistan Security Printing Corporation team in the Patron's Trophy. A month short of his 43rd birthday, he took 6 for 154 off 47 eight-ball overs against Sargodha, who won by an innings and 143 runs.

He batted at number 10 or 11 and only once reached 40 in first-class cricket. On that occasion he scored 112 not out as Karachi Whites scored 762 and beat Karachi Blues by an innings in a semi-final of the Quaid-e-Azam Trophy in 1956-57. He also took three catches and three wickets in the match.

He was a flamboyant character, "playing practical jokes, dating a series of movie stars, driving to matches (often late) in a Cadillac, firing revolver shots in the air in protest at an umpire's decision". Mushtaq Mohammad credited him with the invention of the doosra.

His father, the last Nawab of Manavadar, also played first-class cricket and represented India at hockey.

References

External links

1935 births
1980 deaths
Gujarati people
Pakistani cricketers
Karachi cricketers
Pakistani people of Gujarati descent
Cricketers from Gujarat